Duncan McGregor Graham (31 March 1867 – 19 October 1942) was Labour MP for Hamilton from 1918 to his death.

Born in Airdrie, Graham was educated at various local school before becoming a miner in 1878.  He was elected as a checkweighman in 1892, and soon became active in the trade union movement.  He served as political organiser of the Scottish Miners' Federation from 1908 until 1918, when he was elected for the Labour Party in Hamilton.  That year, he also took up the post of general secretary of the Lanarkshire Miners' County Union, holding it for five years alongside his Parliamentary duties.

References

External links 
 

1867 births
1942 deaths
Members of the Parliament of the United Kingdom for Scottish constituencies
Miners' Federation of Great Britain-sponsored MPs
Scottish Labour MPs
UK MPs 1918–1922
UK MPs 1922–1923
UK MPs 1923–1924
UK MPs 1924–1929
UK MPs 1929–1931
UK MPs 1931–1935
UK MPs 1935–1945